The world's first Bismarck tower was erected by private initiative in 1869 in the village of Ober-Johnsdorf, Silesia, then part of Prussia (today Janówek, Wrocław County, Poland). It stands on top of the hill now called Jańska Góra, 253 m above sea level. The tower itself is 23 m in height.

History

The idea of erecting a monument to Otto von Bismarck had been mooted as far back as 1863 by retired Prussian officer Friedrich Schröter (1820–1888), a wealthy landowner in nearby Wättrisch and an admirer of the Iron Chancellor. Following the Prussian victories in the Second Schleswig War (1864) and the Seven Weeks War (1866), Schröter then set about realising his plans. A site was picked for construction of the tower: the south face of Johnsberg Hill near the neighbouring village of Ober-Johnsdorf, part of which was owned by Schröter (1,100 acres).

Construction began on 15 April 1869, carried out by master mason Bernhardt from Nimptsch under the supervision of a foreman named Rademacher. Serpentine from a local quarry was used as construction material, as well as granite, sandstone and brickwork. Total cost of construction was 18,000 marks.

The tower was inaugurated on 18 October 1869. Over the entrance were inscribed in golden letters the words "IN HONOUR OF BISMARCK - 1869". The ground floor housed two marble slabs, one commemorating the wars of 1864 and 1866, the other the unification of Germany in 1870.

The following year the tower and its surrounding park was opened to the public. The keys to the tower could be rented from the owner in Wättrisch. It was used as an observation deck and recreational centre; in 1910 there was even a wooden pavilion.

Contemporary situation

During World War II, the lower part of the tower sustained damage from an artillery shell. Following Germany's surrender, almost all of Silesia was transferred to Poland in accordance with the Potsdam Agreement. The German inhabitants were expelled and the village was renamed Janówek.

The tower was largely neglected from 1945 onwards. In May 1992, the marble slabs were removed and all references to Bismarck were erased. By August 2002 the tower was in ruins, although it was still possible to ascend the stairs to the central chamber.

The structure is currently in severe need of restoration, and is mostly obscured by the surrounding trees. It was listed as a protected building by the Polish authorities in June 2003.

External links
Bismarck tower in Ober-Johnsdorf (Janówek) (in German)
Bismarck tower in Janówek (in Polish)

Prussian cultural sites
Janowek
Monuments and memorials in Poland
Towers in Poland
Buildings and structures in Lower Silesian Voivodeship